Naian González Norvind or Naian Norvind (February 9, 1992; Mexico City, Mexico) is a Mexican  actress, and writer. She is the daughter of the Mexican actress Nailea Norvind.

Early life
Norvind was born to Fernando Gonzalez Parra and actress Nailea Norvind. She is the granddaughter of Norwegian-Mexican actress Eva Norvind, and through her she is of Finnish and Russian descent.

Norvind is the younger half-sister of actress Camila Sodi and the older sister of actress Tessa Ía.

Career 
She has performed on stage and acted in Mexican TV series and films. In her interview to Mexican newspaper Milenio, she said that she was not afraid of shooting at Tepito (crime rate) for the Mexican show Crónica de castas.

She is cast as Mad Hatter's sister Alice Tetch, in season 3 of Gotham.

She is cast as Christie Watkins in "Backstabbers" the 6th episode of the 6th season of the CBS police procedural drama Blue Bloods on October 23, 2015. She reprised the role in "Erasing History" the 13th episode of the 8th season of the series on Friday, January 19, 2018. In 2018 she starred as the protagonist of Leona, a drama centered on Mexico City's Syrian Jewish community. In 2020 she appeared as tragic protagonist in Michel Franco's dramatic film New Order.

References

External links 

Year of birth missing (living people)
Living people
Mexican stage actresses
Women violinists
Place of birth missing (living people)
21st-century violinists
21st-century women musicians
21st-century Mexican actresses
Mexican television actresses
Mexican film actresses
Mexican people of Finnish descent
Mexican people of Russian descent
Norvind family